Szymbark may refer to the following places:
Szymbark, Lesser Poland Voivodeship (south Poland)
Szymbark, Pomeranian Voivodeship (north Poland)
Szymbark, Warmian-Masurian Voivodeship (north Poland)